Lan Chang (A Million Elephants) may refer to:
Lan Xang, a kingdom in Laos 1353-1707
Lan Chang Province, annexed by Thailand 1941-46